This article describes the all-original 1975 TV series. Not to be confused with the later "Carry On" film-clip compilations or the stage play of the same name.

Carry On Laughing is a British television comedy series produced in 1975 for ATV. Based on the Carry On films, it was an attempt to address the films' declining cinema attendance by transferring the franchise to television. Many of the original cast members were featured in the series.

Carry on Laughing ran for two series, the first for six half-hour episodes and the second for seven episodes. The episode Orgy and Bess featured the final Carry On performances of both Sid James and Hattie Jacques.

The TV series is not as widely known as the original films, which - by contrast - are broadcast regularly on British television.

Production
The series was conceived after the departures of two long-serving Carry On contributors: writer Talbot Rothwell and actor Charles Hawtrey. Furthermore, Kenneth Williams declined to appear in the series. Other Carry On regulars only appeared in a minority of episodes: Sid James in only the first four, Hattie Jacques in only one; and Bernard Bresslaw appeared only in the second series.

In the absence of Rothwell, other writers were brought in. Lew Schwarz and experienced Carry On writer Dave Freeman each wrote six, while Barry Cryer and Dick Vosburgh penned Orgy and Bess.

Each episode parodied a famous TV series, film or book. Three episodes feature a character based on Lord Peter Wimsey - Lord Peter Flimsy. Another two episodes are nods to Upstairs, Downstairs, with the character of Hudson the butler parodied as Clodson, and the cook Mrs. Bridges as Mrs. Breeches.

The series provided an opportunity for David Lodge - little more than a bit-part player in some of the later Carry On films - to play leading characters.

Note

ATV had already helped to bring the Carry Ons to the small screen in 1973, when it broadcast What A Carry On, a one-off show hosted by Shaw Taylor featuring clips from the stage play Carry On London and interviews with its stars - Sid James, Barbara Windsor, Bernard Bresslaw, Kenneth Connor, Peter Butterworth and Jack Douglas. It is believed that this footage is missing from the archives.

What A Carry On was also the title of a BBC series of classic clips from the films.

Episodes

Series 1

Series 2

See also

Related use of the title
The title Carry On Laughing was also used for:
a Carry On stage play performed in Scarborough in 1976 and featuring series regulars Jack Douglas, Kenneth Connor, Peter Butterworth and Liz Fraser.
a series of television programmes shown by Thames Television from 1981 to 1984, featuring classic clips from the Carry On film series, although footage was also drawn from other British comedy films of the era, such as the movie spin-offs of On the Buses and Steptoe and Son.  In 1983, a Christmas special of this series was made, entitled Carry On Laughing's Christmas Classics, featuring classic film clips, linked by newly filmed material with Kenneth Williams and Barbara Windsor.

DVD releases
The entire series was released as DVD bonus features spread over various UK releases of Carry On films. 

A complete 13-episode collection was released in a 2-Disc DVD box set on 25 May 2004 by A&E Home Video, under licence from Carlton International Media Limited (Region 1 format, US and Canada).

Prior to this DVD release, all 13 episodes from both series were released in a set of four VHS video cassettes issued by ITC (Incorporated Television Company Limited) in 1992.

Bibliography

Keeping the British End Up: Four Decades of Saucy Cinema by Simon Sheridan (third edition) (2007) (Reynolds & Hearn Books)

References

External links
 

Carry on Laughing at The British Comedy Guide

1975 British television series debuts
1975 British television series endings
1970s British comedy television series
Laughing, Carry On
ITV sitcoms
Television series by ITV Studios
English-language television shows
Television shows produced by Associated Television (ATV)
Television shows shot at ATV Elstree Studios